The 1931 season of the Mitropa Cup football club tournament was won by First Vienna FC in an all Austrian two-legged final against Wiener Athletiksport Club. This was the fifth edition of the tournament.

The holders, SK Rapid Wien, were unable to defend the cup as two other clubs from Vienna were Austria's representatives.

The final, between the two Vienna clubs, was played on 8 and 12 November 1931 in Zurich and Vienna. First Vienna won both matches, the scores being 3–2 in Zurich and 2–1 in Vienna, and became the second Austrian club to win this tournament following Rapid's success the previous year, and the only team to win the Mitropa Cup unbeaten. Heinrich Hiltl from Wiener Athletiksport Club was top scorer in the tournament with seven goals. Walter Hanke of Wiener AC scored a goal in each leg of the final, whilst Franz Erdl of First Vienna scored both his team's goals in the second leg.

Quarterfinals

|}
a Match decided by play off.

Play-off

|}

Semifinals

|}
b Match decided by play off.

Play-off

|}

Finals

|}

1st leg

2nd leg

Top goalscorers

References

External links 
 Mitropa Cup results at Rec.Sport.Soccer Statistics Foundation

1931
1931–32 in European football
1931–32 in Austrian football
1931–32 in Italian football
1931–32 in Czechoslovak football
1931–32 in Hungarian football